Evaldas Sodeika (born 13 March 1989) is a Lithuanian ballroom dancer. He is currently dancing with his partner Ieva Sodeikienė and competing in the non-professional division.

In the 2014 World Amateur Championships Sodeika/Sodeikienė won bronze medals. During the 2015 European Amateur Championships, two Lithuanian amateur couples reached the final for the first time (Sodeika/Sodeikienė and Lacitis/Golodneva). Sodeika and Sodeikienė ended up winning bronze medals.

Sodeika won the bronze medal in the 2017 World Games in Wrocław, Poland, in Standard.

References 
Evaldas Sodeika at WDSF

Lithuanian ballroom dancers
Living people
Lithuanian male dancers
1989 births
Place of birth missing (living people)
World Games gold medalists
World Games bronze medalists
Competitors at the 2017 World Games
Competitors at the 2022 World Games